Naqdi Kandi (also Romanized as Naqdī Kandī; also known as Nogdi Kandī) is a village in Arshaq Sharqi Rural District, in the Central District of Ardabil County, Ardabil Province, Iran. At the 2006 census, its population was 147, in 24 families.

References 

Tageo

Towns and villages in Ardabil County